The Ivory Ape is a 1980 Japanese-American action film co-produced by Rankin/Bass and Tsuburaya Productions. It was filmed in Bermuda, with a Japanese effects crew, and at Tsuburaya Studios in Tokyo.

It was first broadcast on ABC on April 18, 1980, and later released theatrically in Japan (the theatrical version running four additional minutes).

Synopsis
Set in Bermuda, this movie focuses on a hunt for a rare albino gorilla, recently captured in Africa by ruthless big-game hunter Marc Kazarian (Jack Palance). Dedicated government agent Baxter Mapes (Steven Keats) and his ex-girlfriend, Lil Tyler (Cindy Pickett), conduct a humanitarian search for the ape, which has escaped from the greedy Kazarian. But hero and heroine are fighting against time as the villain has convinced the locals that the ape is a killer, and must be brought in dead or alive.

Cast
Jack Palance - Marc Kazarian 
Steven Keats - Baxter Mapes 
Cindy Pickett - Lil Tyler 
Celine Lomez - Valerie 'Val' Lamont
Lou David - Roomie Pope
Derek Patridge
Earle Hyman
Lou David
Tricia Sembera
William Horrigan
David Man

References

External links
 
 

1980 films
1980 television films
1980 action films
American action television films
1980s English-language films
English-language Japanese films
Films scored by Maury Laws
Films shot in Bermuda
Films set in Bermuda
Rankin/Bass Productions films
Tsuburaya Productions
1980s American films